10 News First is an Australian television newscast, produced by Network 10. The network's ninety-minute long news program airs at 5pm each evening covering local, national and world news, including sport and weather. Weekend editions are presented nationally from Network 10's studios in Pyrmont, Sydney.

Network 10's news division also assists in the production of the morning show Studio 10 and prime-time  current affairs program The Project, and produced in association with CBS News, which is in-house since the 2017 acquisition. It also draws upon the resources of ITN, APTN and Reuters for select international coverage outside that of Paramount Global.

History
Network 10 introduced its news service in 1965 and was a pioneering force behind the concept of the hour-long news bulletin with co-anchors in the form of Eyewitness News from 1973 onwards. The 1980s were the network's most successful period as a news provider with its local Sydney, Melbourne and Brisbane bulletins often rating highest for their 6pm timeslots. Network 10's flagship national nightly bulletin news services has undergone a number of name changes since inception in 1965 including: ATV News in Melbourne, SASTEN News in Adelaide, NewsWatch in Brisbane, TEN News, TEN Evening News, and Ten Eyewitness News, whilst state bulletins titles have included ATV News in Melbourne, SASNEWS in Adelaide and Newswatch in Brisbane

A major change to the service occurred in January 1992 when all five of its local bulletins were moved to the 5.00pm time slot. In 1994 all local weekend bulletins were axed across the network and replaced by a 30-minute network bulletin from Sydney – Ten Weekend News, initially presented by John Gatfield and later by Tracey Spicer, Natarsha Belling and Bill Woods.

A localised version of Ten Weekend News was received from Sydney for Perth, while during the AFL season Adelaide and Melbourne viewers received local news on a Saturday, presented from Melbourne by George Donikian. For a short period in 2009, Ten Weekend News also included localised sport inserts for each market.

10 News First has often been described as a 'training ground' for some of Australia's best-known television journalists. Some of the best-known reporters and presenters who launched or spent a major part of their careers at Network 10 include Jana Wendt, Kerry O'Brien, Katrina Lee, Charles Slade, Ann Sanders, Steve Liebmann, Tim Webster, Ron Wilson, Anne Fulwood, Juanita Phillips, Harry Potter, Liz Hayes, Jo Pearson, David Johnson, Bill McDonald, Chris Masters, Larry Emdur, Eddie McGuire, John Gatfield, Kay McGrath, Graeme Goodings, Sharyn Ghidella, Laurie Oakes, Geraldine Doogue, Helen Kapalos, Jennifer Keyte, Deborah Knight, Bruce McAvaney, Nathan Templeton, Mel McLaughlin, Karl Stefanovic, Mark Beretta, Amber Sherlock and George Donikian amongst others.

In September 2010, the network announced a major expansion of its news service. From 24 January 2011, It expanded its evening news output by introducing a national current affairs program at 6pm, 6PM with George Negus (later 6.30 with George Negus), and an additional local bulletin at 6:30pm on weeknights, under the Ten Evening News brand. In addition, the network announced the re-introduction of local weekend bulletins at 6pm and the axing of its 5pm national bulletin.

Two months after the relaunch, the national weekend bulletins were re-introduced owing to poor ratings, although the 6pm local bulletins continued to air. Later that month, the network dropped its 6:30pm local bulletins on weeknights, extended Ten News at Five to 90 minutes and moved George Negus' program to 6:30pm each weeknight. The changes were introduced on Monday 4 April 2011.

Further changes in September 2011 saw the axing of the network's late night bulletin and the state-based 6pm weekend bulletins. The 5pm national bulletin on Saturdays and Sundays was extended to 90 minutes a month later. Later that month, the network axed 6.30 with George Negus and replaced it with an hour-long version of The 7PM Project (renamed The Project). In November 2011, the last half-hour of Network 10's 5pm state bulletins were rebranded as Ten News at Six. Two months later, the main 5pm bulletin was shortened back to 60 minutes from Sunday 22 January 2012 with The Project moved to 6pm.

The network's Ten Early News bulletin was axed in February 2012 following the launch of Network 10's Breakfast program. More changes during the year saw the return of a networked Ten Late News in a new format launched on 4 June 2012, and the axing of Breakfast on 30 November 2012, due to low ratings and cost-cutting measures at the network.

In September 2013, Network 10 reintroduced the Eyewitness News branding for all of its news output, including the flagship 5pm state bulletins. Two months later, a new breakfast program, Wake Up, was launched.

On 21 May 2014, Network 10 announced it would axe Wake Up and all national news bulletins on weekdays as part of a wider cost-cutting program with the loss of around 150 jobs, caused by poor ratings and advertising revenue. The network also closed its two international bureaux in Los Angeles and London. As of 2018, the state-based 5pm news continues to air, alongside national bulletins at weekends.

In February 2014, Network 10 announced that Hugh Riminton would join Sandra Sully as a co-anchor of the bulletin. In November 2014, Candice Wyatt joined Stephen Quartermain as a co-anchor and finally in August 2015 Lachlan Kennedy joined Georgina Lewis as a co-anchor in Brisbane.

On 16 May 2016, Ten Eyewitness News updated their set and graphics. However, the logo remained unchanged.

In January 2017, the three east coast metro bulletins (Sydney, Melbourne and Brisbane) returned to solo anchors with Hugh Riminton, Candice Wyatt and Lachlan Kennedy returning to reporting duties in February.

In November 2018, alongside a major network relaunch, the Ten Eyewitness News branding was replaced with 10 News First.

On 2 December 2019, the 5pm edition of 10 News First was extended to 90 minutes.

In August 2020, Ten announced it would transfer studio presentation of the Brisbane and Perth bulletins to Sydney with the Adelaide bulletin moved to Melbourne. Reporters, camera crews and editorial staff are retained in Adelaide, Brisbane and Perth.

National bulletins

10 News First Midday
10 News First Midday airs weekdays at 12pm and is presented from the network's Sydney studios by Narelda Jacobs with entertainment  presented by Angela Bishop. The bulletin launched on Monday 9 January 2023.

10 News First Weekend
10 News First Weekend airs on Saturday and Sunday evenings at 5pm and is presented from the network's Sydney studios by Chris Bath with sport presenter Scott Mackinnon and weather presenter Amanda Jason.

The national bulletin was introduced in 1994 to replace state-based bulletins (excluding Adelaide and Perth, who had state-based weekend bulletins until early 1996) but axed in January 2011 ahead of the reintroduction of local editions at 6pm. The national edition was reinstated two months later in the wake of poor ratings. The 6pm local bulletins continued to air until October 2011 when the 5pm national news was extended to 90 minutes.

Until July 2014, a separate edition for Perth and Western Australia was also broadcast from the Pyrmont studios in Sydney. The lack of a separate up-to-date edition of Ten Eyewitness News Weekend for Perth has led to criticisms when outdated time-sensitive news has been broadcast in Western Australia, as in the case of a local 8-year-old junior drag racing accident victim who had died in hospital several hours prior to Ten airing the three-hour-old national bulletin reporting that she was still alive. Localised Sydney-produced weekend editions were restored for Perth and Western Australia by late 2018. The weekend news is presented by former weeknight presenter Narelda Jacobs.

In December 2018, it was announced that Natarsha Belling would move to Studio 10 in 2019 to present news updates throughout the show. Belling was replaced by Chris Bath.

The bulletin has previously been presented by Natarsha Belling, Hermione Kitson, Mike Munro, Matt Doran, Bill Woods, Steve Liebmann, Tracey Spicer and John Gatfield.

Fill-in presenters include Hugh Riminton and Lachlan Kennedy (news).

10 News First Updates
Short localised updates are presented during the afternoons by various state-based reporters or presenters. 
National evening updates are presented on weeknights from Perth.

Sydney and Brisbane

10 News First is presented from TEN-10's Sydney studios at Pyrmont by Sandra Sully with sports presenter Matt Burke and weather presenter Josh Holt.

The bulletin contains opt-outs for local news, sport and weather in Sydney and Brisbane, along with some shared content for the two markets.

The Sydney edition is simulcast on 10 Northern NSW in Northern New South Wales and in Griffith via 10 Griffith, and across Southern New South Wales and the Australian Capital Territory via Southern Cross 10.

The Brisbane edition is simulcast across regional Queensland via Southern Cross 10, the Gold Coast via 10 Northern NSW and to Remote and Central Australia via Central Digital Television. Reporters are also based at a remote newsroom on the Gold Coast.

Melbourne
10 News First is presented from ATV-10's Como Centre studios in South Yarra by Jennifer Keyte with sports presenter Stephen Quartermain and weather presenter Jayde Cotic.
Fill in presenters include Candice Wyatt (News) and Nick Butler, Caty Price and Rob Waters (Sport). 

The network's Melbourne news operation was originally based at the Nunawading studios until a move to the Como Centre in 1992.

Mal Walden joined ATV-10 in April 1987, shortly after his abrupt sacking by HSV-7 - he took over the weekday 5pm bulletin in 1996 alongside Jennifer Hansen who was replaced by Helen Kapalos in 2006. Kapalos was sacked in November 2012 amid cost-cutting measures at the network. Walden anchored the bulletin solo until his retirement in December 2013.

George Donikian was the main male fill-in during the 2000s, including presenting the Saturday 6pm bulletin during the AFL broadcasting rights. He retired in October 2011. Sport presenter Stephen Quartermain then assumed that role, though he had filled-in as news presenter during various times in the past, when Donikian was unavailable.

Mignon Stewart (née Henne) was the main female fill-in for Jennifer Hansen and Helen Kapalos during the 2000s (including for an extended stint in early 2006 before Kapalos started). There was no female fill-in for much of 2008 and 2009. Hermione Kitson became the female fill-in during 2010 and moved to Sydney in 2012.

During the 2000s, occasionally due to availability and network commitments, Walden or Kapalos would present solo (particularly after major events such as the AFL Grand Final).

Traffic Reporter Vanessa O'Hanlon left after six years (2003–2008) in 2008 for ABC News Breakfast. Emma Notarfrancesco left after four and a half years (2010–2015), to work for Formula 1's Australian media team on Friday 20 February 2015. Jimmy Wirtanen then returned to the role.

In November 2014, Candice Wyatt joined Stephen Quartermain as co-anchor of the bulletin, but returned to reporting just over two years later when the bulletin returned to a solo-anchor format.

In May 2018, Network 10 announced that Jennifer Keyte would leave the Seven Network to present the bulletin replacing Stephen Quartermain, who was redeployed to his former role of presenting sport on the bulletin.

Past presenters of Network 10's Melbourne news included David Johnston, who presented the flagship evening bulletin for 16 years (alongside the likes of Jana Wendt and Jo Pearson) until his departure for HSV-7 in 1996.

The Melbourne bulletin is simulcast across most of Victoria via Southern Cross 10, to the city of Mildura via Mildura Digital Television, most of Tasmania via TDT10, Remote and Eastern Australia via Central Digital Television and to the city of Darwin via Darwin Digital Television.

In September 2020, studio production for the Melbourne bulletin was shared with the Adelaide bulletin until it returned to a solo Melbourne bulletin on 3 February 2023.

Adelaide
10 News First is presented from TEN-10's Sydney studios at Pyrmont by Kate Freebairn with sports presenter from ADS-10's Adelaide studios at Eastwood by Max Burford and weather presenter Tiffany Warne.

In 2000, studio production for the 5pm Adelaide bulletin was moved to the network's Melbourne studios in South Yarra. The bulletin was presented from Melbourne for the next decade while sport and weather segments were still presented locally from the station's studios in North Adelaide and subsequently, from 2007, in newly built studios in Hutt Street. Initially, in 2000, George Donikian and Nikki Dwyer relocated from Adelaide to present the new Melbourne based bulletin. After 8 years co-anchoring with Donikian, Dwyer eventually resigned as presenter in late 2000 after she decided to move back to Adelaide, to begin starting a family. Dwyer was subsequently replaced as presenter by Kelly Nestor who resigned in 2006 and was succeeded by Rebecca Morse.

On 21 January 2011, George Donikian presented his final Melbourne-based bulletin for Ten News Adelaide. Studio presentation subsequently returned to ADS-10's Adelaide studios on 24 January 2011, to coincide with the launch of the short-lived 6:30pm local bulletin. Donikian remained in Melbourne, co-presenting the Melbourne edition of Ten News at Five with Helen Kapalos for two months before being reduced to Fridays only, as well as presenting the localised weekend edition. Jane Reilly retired as weather presenter in April 2013 after 37 years and was replaced by Kate Freebairn. A year later, Mark Aiston resigned as sport presenter.

The Adelaide bulletin is simulcast to Port Lincoln and the Upper Spencer Gulf of South Australia as well as the city of Broken Hill, New South Wales via Southern Cross 10, the Riverland and the South East areas of South Australia via 10 South Australia.

In September 2020, studio production for the Adelaide bulletin was transferred back to the Melbourne studio until 3 February 2023.

Perth
10 News First is presented from NEW-10's Perth studios at Subiaco by Natalie Forrest with sports presenter Lachy Reid and weather presenter Beau Pearson.

The Perth bulletin is simulcast to most of regional Western Australia via 10 Western Australia.

Production of the Perth bulletin was initially moved to Pyrmont in 2000, citing high costs of converting the network's Dianella studios. Then-presenters Greg Pearce and Christina Morrissy relocated to Sydney to present the bulletin, whilst sport and weather segments were still presented locally from the station's studios in Dianella. Morrissy later resigned from these duties after suffering deep vein thrombosis on a flight and was replaced by Celina Edmonds. Pearce also later resigned to return to Perth, while Edmonds resigned to spend more time with her family. She then moved to Sky News Australia as a presenter and reporter.

Following their departures, Tim Webster and Charmaine Dragun became the main presenters of Ten News Perth from 2005. After Dragun's untimely death on 2 November 2007, Webster remained as the solo presenter and continued to present the bulletin until 2 May 2008, after which presenting duties were rotated between Ron Wilson, Narelda Jacobs, Deborah Knight and Sandra Sully in Sydney for the seven weeks between Webster's departure and the relocation of the bulletin back to Perth.

On 18 January 2008, it was announced that studio production of Ten News would return to Perth. The network denied that the move was related to the death of Charmaine Dragun as the decision to switch production had been made well beforehand. Narelda Jacobs began presenting in the Sydney studios in May 2008 before Ten News Perth presentation returned to the Dianella studios on Monday 23 June 2008.

In December 2016, Network 10 moved into new offices in Subiaco, relocating from Dianella.

In December 2019, it was announced that former Today Tonight presenter Monika Kos would replace Jacobs as anchor from 13 January 2020 with Jacobs to move to Sydney to co-host Studio 10.

In September 2020, studio production for the Perth bulletin was transferred back to Sydney with Narelda Jacobs returning as anchor. The bulletin continues to air live with sports news presented from the Perth newsroom.
Since 2023 the Perth news has been presented by Natalie Forrest and Hugh Riminton from Sydney. Sport and weather is still being broadcast live from the Perth studios.

On 13 March 2023, the Perth bulletin returned to NEW-10 Subiaco studios in the Perth newsroom for the first time in 3 years. News anchor Natalie Forest will present 10 News First in Perth, while Charlotte Goodlet expected to take over the Perth presenter role when she will return from maternity leave.

Former bulletins

10 News First Breakfast
10 News First Breakfast aired weekdays at 8am and was presented from the network's Sydney studios by Lachlan Kennedy (Monday – Wednesday) and from the network's Melbourne studios by Natasha Exelby (Thursday & Friday). The bulletin was launched on Monday 27 June 2022.

10 News First Sydney 
Until September 2020, 10 News First Sydney was presented from TEN–10's Sydney studios at Pyrmont by Sandra Sully with sports presenter Matt Burke, weather presenter Tim Bailey and traffic reporter Marina Ivanovic.

Between 1995 and 2005, the program was presented by Ron Wilson and Jessica Rowe, until Rowe moved to co-host Today on the Nine Network. She was replaced by then US correspondent Deborah Knight in 2006. Wilson moved to the networked Early News bulletin, after presenting his final 5pm Sydney program as main anchor on Friday 16 January 2009.

In October 2011, Sandra Sully replaced Deborah Knight following the axing of Ten Late News. Knight left the network to join the Nine Network as a Nine News presenter and Weekend Today as a news presenter.

Bill Woods left the network on 30 November 2012 after his contract was not renewed as part of cost-cutting measures. Ron Wilson was also set to leave on the same day, however he stayed until the 28th December that year as he presented his final bulletin for Ten News after being employed there for 34 years. He then moved back to radio in April 2013 as a newsreader and radio announcer for smoothfm. In February 2014, Hugh Riminton joined Sandra Sully as a co-anchor, but returned to reporting three years later when the bulletin returned to a solo-anchor format.

10 News First Brisbane 
Until September 2020, 10 News First Queensland was presented from TVQ's studios at Mt Coot-tha by Georgina Lewis with sports presenter Jonathan Williams, weather presenter Josh Holt and traffic reporter Jayce Barker.

The Brisbane statewide bulletin is simulcast across most of Queensland via WIN Television and to Remote and Central Australia via Central Digital Television. Reporters are also based at a remote newsroom on the Gold Coast.

In August 2015, Lachlan Kennedy joined Georgina Lewis as co-anchor of the bulletin, but returned to reporting merely eighteen months later when the bulletin returned to a solo-anchor format.

Former long-serving presenter Marie-Louise Theile left Ten News on 14 December 2007 to spend more time with her family. Other previous presenters include Geoff Mullins, Tracey Spicer, Brad McEwan and Bill McDonald, who left in November 2012 when his contract was not renewed due to cost-cutting measures.

Ten Eyewitness News Early
The network's early morning news program began as Ten Early News in January 2006, airing for one hour at 6am weekday mornings and featuring a number of segments unique to its timeslot, such as morning newspaper headlines from the country's major papers. The last edition aired on Wednesday 22 February 2012 in preparation of the earlier-than-scheduled launch of Network 10's Breakfast program. The bulletin was revived on 4 November 2013, airing from 5:30am to 6:30am on weekdays, immediately preceding the network's new breakfast program Wake Up.
 
Ten Eyewitness News Early was originally presented by Bill Woods until he became a presenter for the Sydney edition of Ten News at Five, switching roles with Ron Wilson. For the revival, Hermione Kitson anchored alongside sports presenter Scott Mackinnon and weather presenter Amanda Jason.

The final edition of Ten Eyewitness News Early aired on Friday 23 May 2014, when the bulletin was axed alongside the morning and late news bulletins.

Ten Eyewitness News Morning
Ten originally aired a late morning news program from 1980 until cost-cutting measures led to its axing ten years later. It was revived in 1994 and presented by David Johnston from the Melbourne newsroom. From 1994 - 2000 and August - December 2005, Ten Morning News would air after the successful Good Morning Australia with Bert Newton. In 1996, Jason Cameron took over as presenter for the next four years until production was moved to 10's Pyrmont news centre in Sydney, where the bulletin was hosted by Tracey Spicer and Natarsha Belling. In 2004, the bulletin briefly moved to midday (then called Ten News at Noon) to compete against the Australian Broadcasting Corporation's own World at Noon – a decision which proved unpopular.

In 2007, after Tracey Spicer left the network the previous year, Natarsha Belling became the face of the bulletin and continued the role right through to the start of 2012.

During 2010 and 2011, the bulletin aired for one hour at 9am, before The Circle. The bulletin was retired with the launch of Breakfast but returned upon the axing of The Circle in late August 2012, this time airing at 10am on weekdays, presented by Ron Wilson.

The program was axed again on Friday 30 November 2012, marking the final full-length national news to be presented by Ron Wilson after 33 years with Network 10. A morning news bulletin was again revived on 4 November 2013 with the launch of Ten Eyewitness News Morning, anchored by Matt Doran with sports presenter Scott Mackinnon and weather presenter Amanda Jason.

Another round of cost-cutting measures led to the morning news being axed again on Friday 23 May 2014, alongside the early and late news bulletins.

Ten Eyewitness News Late

The network's first late news bulletin, Ten Evening News: Crisis in the Gulf, was hosted by veteran newsreader Eric Walters and was part of the network's coverage of the First Gulf War in January 1991. Walters hosted for four months before being replaced by Anne Fulwood as host of the 30-minute Ten Second Edition News, later Ten Late News, at 10:30pm until her resignation to join the Seven Network in November 1995, whereupon she was replaced by Sandra Sully, who would go on to host the bulletin for most of the next 16 years. The bulletin also aired on weekends, hosted by Tracey Spicer, until the Saturday and Sunday editions were axed in 2004 and 2005 respectively.

In 2006, the bulletin was merged with the late weeknight edition of Sports Tonight on Monday through Thursday nights. Due to declining ratings and increased competition, the bulletin was axed with the final week of episodes hosted by Sandra Sully (news) and Brad McEwan (Sports Tonight) on Monday through Thursday, and Tim Webster on Friday 30 September 2011. Sully became co-host of Sydney's evening bulletin alongside Bill Woods.

The bulletin was revived on 4 June 2012 in a new magazine-style format, hosted by Hamish Macdonald. In September 2013, the bulletin was rebranded as Ten Eyewitness News Late and Danielle Isdale replaced Macdonald after he resigned later that same month. Hugh Riminton replaced Isdale as host and the bulletin returned to a standard news bulletin format. The bulletin was again axed in May 2014 alongside the early and morning news bulletins.

Former programs 
Good Morning Australia (1981–1992)
Meet the Press (1992–2013)
The Bolt Report (2011–2015)
6.30 with George Negus (2011)
Breakfast (2012)
Revealed (2013)
Wake Up (2013–2014)

References

External links
 10 News First

 
Network 10
Network 10 original programming